Y Su Pueblo (And His People) is the title of the 1985 studio album released by Puerto Rican salsa group, El Gran Combo de Puerto Rico. The album became the second #1 album to top the Billboard Tropical Albums chart succeeding the group's previous album, Innovations.

Critical reception

José A. Estévez, Jr. of Allmusic felt that the album was indifferent from the previous albums and gave the album a mixed review. On the hand, he praised the band for "swinging with nice material".

Chart performance

See also
List of number-one Billboard Tropical Albums from the 1980s

References

1985 albums
El Gran Combo de Puerto Rico albums
Spanish-language albums